Baron Stanley of Alderley, in the County of Chester, is a title in the Peerage of the United Kingdom. It was created in 1839 for the politician and landowner Sir John Stanley, 7th Baronet. Upon his death in 1850, he was succeeded as 2nd Baron Stanley of Alderley and 8th Baronet of Alderley Hall by his son Edward, who was a prominent Liberal politician and notably served as President of the Board of Trade, Postmaster General and had in 1848 been created Baron Eddisbury, of Winnington in the County Palatine of Chester, in his own right. His wife Henrietta was a prominent campaigner for women's education. After his death, the Stanley of Alderley and Eddisbury baronies remained united; most holders have since chosen to be known as Lord Stanley of Alderley. The 3rd Baron Stanley of Alderley had a career in the Diplomatic Service; as he was childless he was succeeded by his younger brother, the 4th Baron. He was liberal member of parliament for Oldham. In 1909, the 4th Baron Stanley of Alderley acquired a further title when he succeeded his first cousin once removed, the Earl of Sheffield, according to a special remainder and thus inherited the title of 4th Baron Sheffield. After his death the titles passed to his son, the 5th Baron Stanley of Alderley. He was Liberal Member of Parliament for Eddisbury and also served as Governor of Victoria. His eldest son, the 6th Baron Stanley of Alderley, sold the family seat of Alderley Hall in 1938. He was married four times, the second time to Sylvia Ashley. On his death the titles passed to his younger brother, who preferred to be known as Lord Sheffield. He only held the titles for three months.  the titles are held by the latter's cousin, the 9th Baron Stanley of Alderley, who succeeded his father in that year. He is the grandson of Oliver Hugh Stanley, youngest son of the 4th Baron.

The Stanley baronetcy, of Alderley Hall in the County of Chester, was created in the Baronetage of England in 1660 for the barrister Thomas Stanley. He was a descendant of Sir John Stanley, third son of Thomas Stanley, 1st Baron Stanley (whose eldest son was created Earl of Derby in 1485). He was succeeded by his son, the second Baronet. He was High Sheriff of Cheshire in 1678. His great-grandson, the sixth Baronet, was a Gentleman of the Privy Chamber. His eldest son was the seventh Baronet, who was elevated to the peerage in 1839. See above for further succession.

The Right Reverend Edward Stanley, second son of the sixth Baronet, was Bishop of Norwich. Venetia Stanley was the youngest daughter of the fourth Baron.

The traditional burial place of the Lords Stanley of Alderley was the Stanley Mausoleum in the churchyard of St Mary, Nether Alderley, Cheshire, built in 1909. The building now belongs to the parish council. The London house of the Stanley family at 40 Dover Street was purchased by The Arts Club, a club for gentlemen interested in the arts, in 1896. It remains there to this day.

The family seat now is Rectory Farm, near Stanton St. John, Oxfordshire.

Stanley baronets, of Alderley Hall (1660)
Sir Thomas Stanley, 1st Baronet (1597–1672)
Sir Peter Stanley, 2nd Baronet (1626–1683)
Sir Thomas Stanley, 3rd Baronet (1652–1721)
Sir James Stanley, 4th Baronet (died 1747)
Sir Edward Stanley, 5th Baronet (died 1755)
Sir John Thomas Stanley, 6th Baronet (1735–1807)
Sir John Thomas Stanley, 7th Baronet (1766–1850) (created Baron Stanley of Alderley in 1839)

Baron Stanley of Alderley (1839)
John Thomas Stanley, 1st Baron Stanley of Alderley (1766–1850)
Edward John Stanley, 2nd Baron Stanley of Alderley (1802–1869) (created Baron Eddisbury in 1848)
Henry Edward John Stanley, 3rd Baron Stanley of Alderley and 2nd Baron Eddisbury (1827–1903)
Edward Lyulph Stanley, 4th Baron Sheffield, 4th Baron Stanley of Alderley and 3rd Baron Eddisbury (1839–1925) (known as Lord Stanley of Alderley)
Arthur Lyulph Stanley, 5th Baron Sheffield, 5th Baron Stanley of Alderley and 4th Baron Eddisbury (1875–1931) (known as Lord Stanley of Alderley)
Edward John Stanley, 6th Baron Sheffield, 6th Baron Stanley of Alderley and 5th Baron Eddisbury (1907–1971) (known as Lord Stanley of Alderley)
Lyulph Henry Victor Owen Stanley, 7th Baron Sheffield, 7th Baron Stanley of Alderley and 6th Baron Eddisbury (1915–1971) (known as Lord Sheffield)
Thomas Henry Oliver Stanley, 8th Baron Sheffield, 8th Baron Stanley of Alderley and 7th Baron Eddisbury (1927–2013) (known as Lord Stanley of Alderley)

The heir presumptive is the present holder William Harris (born 1958).

See also
 Audley-Stanley family
Earl of Derby
Baron Sheffield
Baron Eddisbury

References

 
1839 establishments in the United Kingdom
Baronies in the Peerage of the United Kingdom
Noble titles created in 1839
Stanley family